Thousands of beetle (Coleoptera) species are found in Thailand. This list gives a selection of about 500 beetle species (and/or subspecies) as listed in Ek-Amnuay (2008).

Family Cicindelidae (tiger beetles)
Tricondyla
Tricondyla annulicornis
Tricondyla mellyi
Neocollyris
Neocollyris bonellii
Collyris
Collyris mniszechi
Cylindera
Cylindera minuta
Calochroa
Calochroa anometallescens
Calochroa cariana
Calochroa elegantula
Calochroa flavomaculata
Calochroa laurae
Calochroa mouhoti
Calochroa shozoi
Calochroa tritoma
Cosmodela (= Cicindela)
Cosmodela aurulenta
Cosmodela barmanica
Cosmodela duponti
Cosmodela juxtata
Cosmodela virgula
Lophyra
Lophyra striolata

Family Lucanidae (stag beetles)

Lucanus
Lucanus coronatus
Lucanus fairmairei
Lucanus fryi
Lucanus koyamai
Lucanus laminifer
Lucanus miyashitai
Lucanus sericeus
Hexarthrius
Hexarthrius deyrollei
Hexarthrius nigritus
Hexarthrius parryi
Hexarthrius vitalisi
Calcodes
Calcodes aeratus
Odontolabis
Odontolabis cuvera
Odontolabis dalmani
Odontolabis elegans
Odontolabis fallaciosa
Odontolabis femoralis
Odontolabis gazella
Odontolabis latipennis
Odontolabis macrocephalus
Odontolabis mouhoti
Odontolabis sinensis
Odontolabis siva
Neolucanus
Neolucanus brevis
Neolucanus castanopterus
Neolucanus flavipennis
Neolucanus giganteus
Neolucanus latus
Neolucanus maekajanensis
Neolucanus maximus
Neolucanus nitidus
Neolucanus parryi
Neolucanus pseudopacus
Neolucanus rondoni
Neolucanus saundersi
Neolucanus sinicus
Figulus
Figulus caviceps
Nigidius
Nigidius birmanicus
Nigidius dawnae
Nigidius distinctus
Nigidius elongatus
Allotopus
Allotopus babai
Allotopus moellenkampi
Cyclommatus
Cyclommatus bicolor
Cyclommatus canaliculatus
Cyclommatus chiangmaienesis
Cyclommatus lunifer
Cyclommatus multidentatus
Cyclommatus pahangensis
Cyclommatus saltini
Rhaetulus
Rhaetulus boileaui
Rhaetulus didieri
Rhaetulus speciosus
Prismognathus
Prismognathus kurosawai
Prosopocoilus
Prosopocoilus asaetosus
Prosopocoilus astacoides
Prosopocoilus biplagiatus
Prosopocoilus buddha
Prosopocoilus bulbosus
Prosopocoilus crenulidens
Prosopocoilus giraffa
Prosopocoilus inquinatus
Prosopocoilus jenkinsi
Prosopocoilus kannegieteri
Prosopocoilus kuijteni
Prosopocoilus mandibularis
Prosopocoilus mohnikei
Prosopocoilus nigritus
Prosopocoilus occipitalis
Prosopocoilus ovatus
Prosopocoilus oweni
Prosopocoilus pascoei
Prosopocoilus passaloides
Prosopocoilus pseudospineus
Prosopocoilus sericeus
Prosopocoilus spineus
Prosopocoilus squamilateris
Prosopocoilus superbus
Prosopocoilus suturalis
Prosopocoilus taronii
Prosopocoilus zebra
Macrodorcas
Macrodorcas bisignatus
Macrodorcas giselae
Macrodorcas pseudaxis
Hemisodorcus (= Nipponodorcus)
Hemisodorcus arrowi
Serrognathus
Serrognathus lineatopunctatus
Serrognathus platymelus
Serrognathus reichei
Serrognathus subtaurus
Serrognathus taurus
Serrognathus titanus
Dynodorcus
Dynodorcus antaeus
Dynodorcus curvidens
Dynodorcus volscens
Dorcus
Dorcus gracilicornis
Velutinodorcus
Velutinodorcus velutinus
Aegus
Aegus amplus
Aegus chelifer
Aegus parallelus

Family Passalidae (bess beetles)
Aceraius
Aceraius grandis
Ceracupes
Ceracupes fronticornis
Leptaulax
Leptaulax cyclotaenius
Leptaulax dentatus
Tiberioides
Tiberioides borealis
Tiberioides kuwerti

Family Scarabaeidae (scarab beetles)

Subfamily Dynastinae
Blabephorus
Blabephorus pinguis
Chalcosoma
Chalcosoma atlas
Chalcosoma caucasus
Clyster
Clyster retusus
Eophileurus
Eophileurus chinensis
Eophileurus cingalensis
Eophileurus platypterus
Eupatorus
Eupatorus birmanicus
Eupatorus gracilicornis
Eupatorus siamensis
Oryctes
Oryctes gnu
Oryctes rhinoceros
Pachyoryctes
Pachyoryctes solidus
Trichogomphus
Trichogomphus martabani
Trichogomphus mongol
Trypoxylus
Trypoxylus dichotomus
Trypoxylus politus
Xylotrupes
Xylotrupes gideon

Subfamily Euchirinae (long-armed beetles)
Cheirotonus
Cheirotonus gestroi
Cheirotonus parryi

Subfamily Coprinae (Scarabaeinae) (dung beetles)
Catharsius
Catharsius molossus
Copris
Copris magicus
Copris nevinsoni
Copris signatus
Digitonthophagus
Digitonthophagus bonasus
Garreta
Garreta ruficornis
Gymnopleurus
Gymnopleurus aethiops
Gymnopleurus sinuatus
Heliocopris
Heliocopris bucephalus
Heliocopris dominus
Liatongus
Liatongus rhadamistus
Onitis
Onitis excavatus
Onitis philemon
Onitis singhalensis
Onitis siva
Onitis virens
Onthophagus
Onthophagus imperator
Onthophagus seniculus
Synapsis
Synapsis birmanicus
Synapsis tridens

Subfamily Geotrupinae
Enoplotrupes
Enoplotrupes sharpi

Subfamily Melolonthinae (June beetles)
Lepidiota
Lepidiota stigma
Polyphylla
Polyphylla tonkinensis

Subfamily Rutelinae
Adoretus
Adoretus compressus
Anomala
Anomala dimidiata
Anomala diversipennis
Anomala grandis
Anomala variegata
Dicaulocephalus
Dicaulocephalus feae
Dicaulocephalus tetsuoi
Fruhstorferia
Fruhstorferia birmanica
Fruhstorferia dohertyi
Fruhstorferia sexmaculata
Parastasia
Parastasia alternata
Parastasia birmana
Parastasia ochracea
Parastasia sulcipennis
Peltonotus
Peltonotus morio
Peperonota
Peperonota harringtoni

Subfamily Cetoniinae (flower beetles)

Tribe Cremastochellini
Campsiura
Campsiura gloriosa
Campsiura insignis
Campsiura javanica
Clinterocera
Clinterocera jucunda
Coenochilus
Coenochilus apicalis
Cymophorus
Cymophorus pulchellus
Goliathopsis
Goliathopsis duponti
Goliathopsis ferreroi

Tribe Schizorhinini
Agestrata
Agestrata orichalca
Thaumastopeus
Thaumastopeus arrowi
Thaumastopeus nigritus
Thaumastopeus pugnator

Tribe Goliathini
Anomalocera
Anomalocera subopaca
Dicheros
Dicheros bicornis
Dicheros inermiceps
Dicheros siamensis
Dicranocephalus
Dicranocephalus wallichii
Euchloropus
Euchloropus laetus
Heterorrhina
Heterorrhina leonardi
Heterorrhina micans
Ingrisma
Ingrisma bilobiceps
Ingrisma burmanica
Ingrisma euryrrhina
Jumnos
Jumnos ferreroiminettiique
Jumnos ruckeri
Platynocephalus
Platynocephalus arnaudi
Platynocephalus miyashitai
Rhomborhina
Rhomborhina jeannelli
Rhomborhina mellyi
Rhomborhina resplendens
Trigonophorus
Trigonophorus feae
Trigonophorus foveiceps
Trigonophorus nepalensis
Torynorrhina
Torynorrhina distincta
Torynorrhina flammea
Torynorrhina thiemei

Tribe Cetoniini
Cetonia
Cetonia rutilans
Gametis
Gametis bealiae
Gametis histrio
Glycosia
Glycosia tricolor
Glycyphana
Glycyphana catena
Glycyphana chamnongi
Glycyphana fadilae
Glycyphana festiva
Glycyphana horsfieldi
Glycyphana malayensis
Glycyphana nepalensis
Glycyphana nicobarica
Glycyphana ornata
Glycyphana quadricolor
Glycyphana sinuata
Glycyphana swainsonii
Gymnophana
Gymnophana oatesi
Oxythyrea
Oxythyrea cinctella
Protaetia
Protaetia acuminata
Protaetia cariana
Protaetia caudata
Protaetia chaminadei
Protaetia chicheryi
Protaetia fulgidipes
Protaetia fusca
Protaetia himalayana
Protaetia montana
Protaetia niveoguttata
Protaetia rubrocuprea
Protaetia ventralis

Tribe Gymnetini
Clinteria
Clinteria atra
Clinteria ducalis
Clinteria egens

Tribe Diplognathini
Anthracophora
Anthracophora siamensis

Tribe Phaedimini
Theodosia
Theodosia ayuthia
Theodosia perakensis
Mycteristes
Mycteristes minettii
Mycteristes tibetanus

Tribe Taenioderini
Clerota
Clerota rigifica
Coilodera
Coilodera penicillata
Euselates
Euselates laotica
Euselates ornata
Euselates perraudieri
Euselates schoenfeldti
Euselates virgata
Ixorida
Ixorida magnierei
Ixorida mouhoti
Meroloba
Meroloba suturalis
Taeniodera
Taeniodera borneensis
Taeniodera flavofasciata
Taeniodera idolica
Taeniodera malabariensis
Taeniodera puncticollis
Taeniodera sericea
Taeniodera sericoides
Taeniodera simillima

Family Buprestidae (jewel beetles)

Subfamily Julodinae
Sternocera
Sternocera aequisignata
Sternocera chrysis
Sternocera punctatofaveata
Sternocera ruficornis

Subfamily Polycestinae
Acmaeodera
Acmaeodera coomani
Acmaeodera ichikoae
Acmaeodera interrupta
Acmaeodera stictipennis
Cochinchinula
Cochinchinula quadriareolata
Mastogenius
Mastogenius taoi
Microacmaeodera
Microacmaeodera rolciki
Odettea
Odettea laosensis
Paratrachys
Paratrachys chinensis
Schoutedeniastes (= Polyctesis)
Schoutedeniastes ohkurai
Ptosima
Ptosima strandi
Strigoptera
Strigoptera bimaculata

Subfamily Chrysochroinae

Catoxantha
Catoxantha borneensis
Catoxantha chunrami
Catoxantha opulenta
Catoxantha pierrei
Chalcophora
Chalcophora yunnana
Chrysochroa
Chrysochroa baudoni
Chrysochroa buqueti
Chrysochroa corbetti
Chrysochroa edwardsii
Chrysochroa ephippigera
Chrysochroa fulgens
Chrysochroa fulminans
Chrysochroa marinae
Chrysochroa mniszechii
Chrysochroa parryi
Chrysochroa purpureiventris
Chrysochroa rajah
Chrysochroa rondoni
Chrysochroa rugicollis
Chrysochroa saundersii
Chrysochroa thailandica
Chrysochroa unnoi
Chrysochroa viridisplendens
Chrysochroa vittata
Chrysochroa wiwuti
Cyalithus
Cyalithus cohici
Cyalithus vitalisi
Demochroa
Demochroa bowringi
Demochroa gratiosa
Evides
Evides fairmairei
Iridotaenia
Iridotaenia chrysostoma
Iridotaenia igniceps
Iridotaenia tonkinea
Lampetis
Lampetis affinis
Lampetis psilopteroides
Lampetis puncticollis
Lampetis viridicuprea
Megaloxantha
Megaloxantha brunnea
Megaloxantha concolor
Megaloxantha gigantea
Megaloxantha longiantennata
Megaloxantha mouhotii
Micropistus
Micropistus igneiceps
Micropistus microcephalus
Philocteanus
Philocteanus moricii
Chrysopistus
Chrysopistus savangvattanai

Subfamily Buprestinae
Anthaxia
Anthaxia coomani
Anthaxia rondoni
Bellamyola
Bellamyola mouhoti
Pseudhyperantha
Pseudhyperantha pinratanai
Belionota
Belionota ignicollis
Belionota prasina
Chrysobothris
Chrysobothris superba
Coomaniella
Coomaniella purpurascens
Karenaxia
Karenaxia similis
Lamprodila
Lamprodila magnifica
Lamprodila sarrauti
Philanthaxia
Philanthaxia aenea
Philanthaxia purpuriceps

Subfamily Agrilinae
Coraebus
Coraebus wiwuti
Habroloma
Habroloma lateroalbum

Subfamily Galbellinae
Galbella
Galbella violacea

Family Meloidae (blister beetles)
Cissites
Cissites maxillosa
Eletica
Eletica castanea
Epicauta
Epicauta hirticornis
Epicauta maklini
Epicauta waterhousei
Mylabris
Mylabris cichorii
Mylabris phalerata

Family Disteniidae (longicorn beetles)
Cyrtonops
Cyrtonops punctipennis

Family Cerambycidae
(A longer list of Cerambycidae species can be found at the Thailand Nature Project's website.)

Subfamily Prioninae
Macrotoma
Macrotoma crenata
Macrotoma fisheri
Rhaphipodus
Rhaphipodus fatalis
Rhaphipodus fruhstorferi

Tribe Eurypodini
Eurypoda
Eurypoda batesi
Eurypoda nigrita
Megopis
Megopis costipennis
Megopis maculosa
Megopis marginalis
Megopis ornaticollis
Megopis procera
Megopis sinica

Tribe Prionini
Dorysthenes
Dorysthenes beli
Dorysthenes buqueti
Dorysthenes granulosus
Dorysthenes walkeri
Prionomma
Prionomma bigibbosus

Tribe Anacolini
Sarmydus
Sarmydus antennatus

Subfamily Philinae
Philus
Philus costatus

Subfamily Leptirinae
Strangalia
Strangalia duffyi

Subfamily Cerambycinae

Tribe Methiini
Oplatocera
Oplatocera callidiosa
Xystrocera
Xystrocera festiva
Xystrocera globosa

Tribe Hesperophanini
Gnatholea
Gnatholea eburifera
Gnatholea subnuda
Stromatium
Stromatium longicorne
Zoodes
Zoodes fulguratus

Tribe Cerambycini
Aeolesthes
Aeolesthes aureopilosa
Aeolesthes aurifaber
Aeolesthes laosensis
Aeolesthes sinensis
Cyriopalus
Cyriopalus wallacei
Derolus
Derolus argentesignatus
Hoplocerambyx
Hoplocerambyx spinicornis
Massicus
Massicus trilineatus
Neocerambyx
Neocerambyx gigas
Neocerambyx grandis
Plocaederus
Plocaederus obesus
Plocaederus ruficornis
Rhytidodera
Rhytidodera grandis
Rhytidodera integra
Xoanodera
Xoanodera regularis
Xoanodera striata

Tribe Callidiopini
Ceresium
Ceresium leucosticticum
Trinophylum
Trinophylum descarpentriesi

Tribe Prothemini
Prothema
Prothema aurata

Tribe Callichromini

Anubis
Anubis bipustulatus
Anubis inermis
Aphrodisium
Aphrodisium cantori
Aphrodisium faldermannii
Aphrodisium neoxenum
Aphrodisium subplicatum
Chelidonium
Chelidonium buddleiae
Chelidonium venereum
Chloridolum
Chloridolum alcmene
Chloridolum laotium
Embrikstrandia
Embrikstrandia bicolor
Embrikstrandia unifasciata
Nothopeus
Nothopeus drescheri
Nothopeus hemipterus
Pachyteria
Pachyteria dimidiata
Pachyteria violaceothoracica
Polyzonus
Polyzonus latemaculatus
Polyzonus nitidicollis
Polyzonus obtusus
Polyzonus pakxensis
Polyzonus sinensis
Polyzonus subobtusus
Polyzonus tetraspilotus
Zonopterus
Zonopterus flavitarsis

Tribe Purpuricenini
Euryphagus
Euryphagus lundii
Pavieia
Pavieia superba
Purpuricenus
Purpuricenus malaccensis

Tribe Pyrestini
Erythrus
Erythrus championi
Erythrus laticornis
Pachylocerus
Pachylocerus sulcatus
Rosalia
Rosalia decempunctata
Rosalia formosa
Rosalia lameerei

Tribe Clytini

Chlorophorus
Chlorophorus annularis
Chlorophorus arciferus
Chlorophorus rubricollis
Chlorophorus sappho
Chlorophorus siamensis
Clytosaurus
Clytosaurus siamensis
Demonax
Demonax albidofasciatus
Demonax elongatus
Demonax gracilestriatus
Demonax literatus
Perissus
Perissus mimicus
Rhaphipodus hopei
Rhaphuma
Rhaphuma diana
Rhaphuma horsfieldi
Rhaphuma patkaina
Rhaphuma phiale
Rhaphuma quadrimaculata
Sclethrus
Sclethrus amoenus
Xylotrechus
Xylotrechus chinensis
Xylotrechus magicus
Xylotrechus unicarinatus

Tribe Cleomenini
Cleomenes
Cleomenes nigricollis
Nida
Nida flavovittata

Subfamily Lamiinae

Tribe Mesosini
Agelasta
Agelasta birmanica
Coptops
Coptops annulipes
Golsinda
Golsinda basicornis
Mesosa
Mesosa nigrofasciaticollis

Tribe Xylorhizini
Thylactus
Thylactus simulans
Xylorhiza
Xylorhiza adusta

Tribe Apomecynini
Apomecyna
Apomecyna niveosparsa
Apomecyna saltator
Pemptolasius
Pemptolasius humeralis

Tribe Agapanthiini
Antennohyllisia
Antennohyllisia rondoni
Eucomatocera
Eucomatocera vittata
Pothyne
Pothyne variegata

Tribe Pteropliini
Alidus
Alidus biplagiatus
Mispila
Mispila curvilinea
Niphona
Niphona falaizei
Niphona longesignata
Niphona rondoni
Pterolophia
Pterolophia zebrina
Sthenias
Sthenias pascoei
Tenebrio molitor

Tribe Morimopsini
Lamiodorcadion
Lamiodorcadion laosense

Tribe Lamiini

Acalolepta
Acalolepta pseudospeciosa
Acalolepta sericeipennis
Anamera
Anamera alboguttata
Anamera harmandi
Anoplophora
Anoplophora birmanica
Anoplophora elegans
Anoplophora horsfieldii
Anoplophora sollii
Anoplophora versteegi
Anoplophora zonator
Arctolamia
Arctolamia fasciata
Arctolamia fruhstorferi
Arctolamia luteomaculata
Arctolamia villosa
Aristobia
Aristobia approximator
Aristobia freneyi
Aristobia horridula
Aristobia voeti
Blepephaeus
Blepephaeus lemoulti
Blepephaeus stigmosus
Blepephaeus succinctor
Calothyrza
Calothyrza margaritifera
Cerosterna
Cerosterna fabricii
Cerosterna pollinosa
Cerosterna rouyeri
Epepeotes
Epepeotes luscus
Eutaenia
Eutaenia corbetti
Eutaenia trifasciella
Gerania
Gerania bosci
Macrochenus
Macrochenus assamensis
Macrochenus isabellinus
Paraleprodera
Paraleprodera cordifera
Paraleprodera crucifera
Paraleprodera insidiosa
Paraleprodera stephanus
Parepepeotes
Parepepeotes breuningi
Pharsalia
Pharsalia subgemmata
Pseudomeges
Pseudomeges marmoratus
Sarothrocera
Sarothrocera lowii
Spinaristobia
Spinaristobia rondoni
Stegenagapanthia
Stegenagapanthia albovittata
Stratioceros
Stratioceros princeps
Trachystolodes
Trachystolodes tonkinensis
Thermonotus
Thermonotus nigripes

Tribe Batocerini
Apriona
Apriona germari
Batocera
Batocera davidis
Batocera lineolata
Batocera numitor
Batocera parryi
Batocera roylei
Batocera rubus
Batocera rufomaculata
Batocera victoriana

Tribe Gnomini
Imantocera
Imantocera penicillata

Tribe Ancylonotini
Palimna
Palimna annulata

Tribe Dorcaschematini
Cylindrecamptus
Cylindrecamptus lineatus
Microlenecamptus
Microlenecamptus albonotatus
Microlenecamptus flavosignatus
Olenecamptus
Olenecamptus bilobus
Olenecamptus dominus
Olenecamptus laosus
Olenecamptus quinquemaculatus
Olenecamptus siamensis

Tribe Crossotini
Moechotypa
Moechotypa coomani
Moechotypa suffusa

Tribe Petrognathini
Ioesse
Ioesse sanguinolenta
Threnetica
Threnetica lacrymans

Tribe Ceroplesini
Diastocera
Diastocera wallichi

Tribe Astathini
Astathes
Astathes gibbicollis
Astathes tibialis

Tribe Saperdini
Glenea
Glenea aeolis
Glenea astathiformis
Glenea cantor
Glenea elegans
Glenea laosensis
Glenea laosica
Glenea mediotransversevittata
Glenea proserpina
Glenea pulchra
Glenea indiana

Family Trictenotomidae
Trictenotoma
Trictenotoma childreni
Trictenotoma davidi
Trictenotoma mouhoti
Autocrates
Autocrates aeneus

Others
Mormolyce
Mormolyce phyllodes
Mouhotia
Mouhotia planipennis

See also
List of ants of Thailand
List of butterflies of Thailand
List of species native to Thailand

References

External links
Coleptera at the Thailand Nature Project
Tentative checklist of Family Cerambycidae (Thailand) - Long-horned Beetles
Partial Checklist of Family Chrysomelidae - Leaf Beetles from Thailand
Partial checklist of Superfamily Curculionoidea

Thailand
Beetles